Pattukkottai taluk is a taluk of Thanjavur district of the Indian state of Tamil Nadu. The headquarters of the taluk is the town of Pattukkottai. It is the biggest taluk in the district.

Demographics
According to the 2011 census, the taluk of Pattukkottai had a population of 396,476 with 191,592 males and 204,884 females. There were 1,069 women for every 1,000 men. The taluk had a literacy rate of 73.3%. Child population in the age group below 6 was 19,083 Males and 18,438 Females.

Villages

 Aaladikumulai
 Aalampallam
 Aalathur
 Aathikkottai
 Adirampattinam
 Anaikkadu
 Athiveddi
 Balareguramasamudram
 Chatramthokkalikadu
 Chokkanathapuram
 Chokkanavur
 Eduthanivayal
 Enathi
 Ennaivayal
 Eralivayal
 Ettivayal
 Ettupulikkadu
 Gopalasamudram
 K.Unjiyaviduthi
 Kalichankkottai
 Kallivayal
 Karisavayal
 Kasankkadu
 Kattaiyankadu
 Kayavoor
 Kollukkadu
 Kotthadivayal
 Kullukkadu
 Madampattavur
 Madathikkadu
 Madubashanipuram
 Manavayal
 Mannankadu
 Maravakkadu
 Maravanvayal
 Marudangavayal
 Mohur
 Moothakkuruchi
 Naduvikurichi
 Nainankulam
 Narasingapuram 
 Nattuchalai
 Neivaviduthi
 Palanjur
 Palathali
 Palayee Agraharam
 Pallathur
 Palliodiaivayal
 Parakkalakkottai
 Pillankuli
 Ponkundu
 Ponnaivaraiyankkottai
 Poovalur
 Pudhukkottai Ullur
 Pudupattinam
 Pukkarambai
 Pulavanchi
 Puliyakudi 
 Regunathapuram
 Reguramasamudram
 Rendampulikadu
 Silambavelankkadu
 Soorankkadu
 Sukkiranpatti
 Surappallam
 Thamarankkottai
 Thittakkudi
 Thittakudi
 Thuvarankuruchi
 Thuravikkadu
 Udayamudaiyan
 Vaattakkudi
 Vadiakkadu
 Vellivayal
 Vendakkottai

References

External links 
 

Taluks of Thanjavur district